Long Pine National Forest was established as the Long Pine Forest Reserve in Montana on September 24, 1906 with . It became a National Forest on March 4, 1907. On July 1, 1908 it was absorbed by Sioux National Forest and the name was discontinued.

The forest today comprises the Long Pines unit of the Sioux Ranger District of Custer National Forest, in Carter County, Montana with 320 acres in Harding County, South Dakota.

See also
 List of forests in Montana

References

External links
Sioux Ranger District, Custer National Forest
Forest History Society
Listing of the National Forests of the United States and Their Dates (from the Forest History Society website) Text from Davis, Richard C., ed. Encyclopedia of American Forest and Conservation History. New York: Macmillan Publishing Company for the Forest History Society, 1983. Vol. II, pp. 743-788.

Former National Forests of Montana
Protected areas of Carter County, Montana
1907 establishments in Montana